Frans Reinhold Kjellman (4 November 1846 – 22 April 1907) was a Swedish botanist who specialized in marine phycology and is known in particular for his work on Arctic algae.
  
Kjellman became a Ph.D. and docent of botany at the University of Uppsala in 1872, taught at the Fjellstedt School, founded by Peter Fjellstedt, in Uppsala 1872–1878, and was appointed professor extraordinary at the University 1883. He was acting professor of botany 1893–1897 and briefly in 1899, before being appointed to the Borgströmian Professorship of Botany and Practical Economy in December 1899.

He participated in several Arctic expeditions and was the botanist under Adolf Erik Nordenskiöld in 1878 aboard the S/S Vega, the first ship to sail the Northeast passage.  From this and other Arctic expeditions, Kjellman wrote an important early work on the marine algae of the Arctic, The Algae of the Arctic Sea: A survey of the species, together with an exposition of the general characters and the development of the flora.

See also
 Vega expedition

References

Franzén, Olle, "Kjellman, Frans Reinhold", Svenskt biografiskt lexikon, 21, pp. 220-222.
Kjellman, F.R. 1883. The Algae of the Arctic Sea. A survey of the species, together with an exposition of the general characters and development of the flora. - K.Sv. Vet.-Akad. Handl.,  Vol. 20. Stockholm.

Kjellman, Frans Reinhold
1846 births
1907 deaths
Botanists active in the Arctic
20th-century Swedish botanists